Brian S. Masse  (born July 9, 1968) is a Canadian politician.  He has served in the House of Commons of Canada since 2002, representing the riding of Windsor West as a member of the New Democratic Party.

Masse is married to Terry Chow, with whom he has a daughter and a son.

Early life and career
Masse was born in Windsor, Ontario.  He received a Bachelor of Arts degree in Sociology from Wilfrid Laurier University in 1991, and has completed course work for a Master of Arts degree at the University of Windsor.  During the 1990s, he was a job developer for the Association for Persons with Physical Disabilities and a program coordinator for the Multicultural Council of Windsor and Essex County.

Masse gained local prominence in 1996 for his opposition to a dance bar that was planned for a residential neighbourhood.  He was elected for Ward 2 of the Windsor city council in 1997, and was re-elected in 2000.  In 1998, he played a prominent role in preventing a rock-crushing operation from opening in the Wellington Avenue area.

In May 2001, the Windsor city council unanimously approved Masse's motion to prevent school boards from selling vacant property lots at the highest market value.  His purpose was to dissuade boards from closing schools, though some criticized the motion as working against taxpayer interests.  Masse later called for a referendum on a proposed new arena project, but this was not accepted by council.

Brian Masse has a son and daughter named Wade Masse and Alexandria Masse. Wade Masse was born December 8, 2003. Alexandria Masse was born September 26, 2000. He also has a wife Terry Chow.

Member of Parliament
Masse joined the federal New Democratic Party in 1997, and was first elected to the Canadian parliament in a by-election held on May 13, 2002.  The election was called after the resignation of Herb Gray, a long-time Liberal cabinet minister who had been a Member of Parliament (MP) since 1962.  Masse won the NDP nomination without opposition, and defeated Liberal candidate Richard Pollock by 2,477 votes to win the seat.  He was re-elected by a greater margin in the 2004 general election.  Masse's success in 2002 was partly due to support from Joe Comartin, a fellow Windsor New Democrat who was elected to the House of Commons in the 2000 federal election.  In 2002–03, Masse supported Comartin's bid for the NDP leadership.

Masse served as the NDP critic for Auto Policy, Canada Border Services, and Customs in the 38th Canadian parliament.  He also became a member of the newly formed all-party "Border Caucus", examining aspects of Canada-U.S. trade relations.  He introduced a motion in 2004 to restrict large pharmaceutical companies from renewing their patent protection, and has worked in support of Stephen Lewis's efforts to bring affordable AIDS drugs to Africa.

During his first campaign for the House of Commons, the Windsor Star newspaper ran an editorial opposing him as "a bench-warmer, a yes-man, a political careerist".  Two years later, however, a leading Star columnist wrote that Masse had "vastly exceeded expectations and quickly developed into an able, hard-working representative who has stayed on top of riding issues".

Masse was re-elected in the 2006 federal election with an increased majority over Liberal Werner Keller.  He served as NDP Deputy Industry Critic.  After the election, Masse and Comartin spoke out against the provincial NDP's decision to remove Canadian Auto Workers leader Buzz Hargrove from the party.

Masse has criticized Industry Minister Maxime Bernier's plans to deregulate Canada's telecommunications market and ease restrictions on foreign ownership, arguing that the reforms could result in a small number of companies controlling the Canadian industry.

Since 2015, Masse has sat on the NDP frontbench as the critic for Innovation, Science and Economic Development.

Masse was re-elected in the 2019 Canadian federal election, finishing ahead of former Liberal MPP Sandra Pupatello.

Electoral record

Federal

|- bgcolor="white"

|align="left" colspan=2|New Democratic Party hold 

|- bgcolor="white"

|align="left" colspan=2|New Democratic Party hold

Municipal

Results provided by the City of Windsor.

Results are provided by the City of Windsor.

Electors could vote for two candidates in the municipal elections. The percentages are determined in relation to the total number of votes.

All federal election information is taken from Elections Canada.  Italicized expenditures refer to submitted totals, and are presented when the final reviewed totals are not available.

References

External links
Official website

1968 births
Living people
Members of the House of Commons of Canada from Ontario
New Democratic Party MPs
University of Windsor alumni
Windsor, Ontario city councillors
Wilfrid Laurier University alumni
21st-century Canadian politicians